Longgou (Mandarin: 龙沟乡) is a township in Zhaojue County, Liangshan Yi Autonomous Prefecture, Sichuan, China. In 2010, Longgou Township had a total population of 1,833: 978 males and 855 females: 602 aged under 14, 1,133 aged between 15 and 65 and 98 aged over 65.

References 
 

Township-level divisions of Sichuan
Zhaojue County